The Nazas pupfish (Cyprinodon nazas), known in Spanish as cachorrito del aguanaval, is a species of pupfish in the family Cyprinodontidae. It is endemic to Mexico where found in the states of Coahuila, Durango and Zacatecas.

References

Cyprinodon
Endemic fish of Mexico
Freshwater fish of Mexico
Endangered biota of Mexico
Taxa named by Robert Rush Miller
Fish described in 1976
Taxonomy articles created by Polbot